Senator Henderson may refer to:

Members of the Australian Senate
George Henderson (Australian politician) (1857–1933), Australian Senator from Western Australia from 1904 to 1923
Sarah Henderson (born 1964), Australian Senator from Victoria since 2019

Members of the United States Senate
Charles Henderson (Nevada politician) (1873–1954), U.S. Senator from Nevada from 1918 to 1921
James Pinckney Henderson (1808–1858), U.S. Senator from Texas from 1857 to 1858
John B. Henderson (1826–1913), U.S. Senator from Missouri from 1862 to 1869
John Henderson (Mississippi politician) (1797–1857), U.S. Senator from Mississippi from 1839 to 1845

United States state senate members
Deidre Henderson, Utah State Senate
Frank Henderson (South Dakota politician) (1928–2012), South Dakota State Senate
James Henderson Jr. (born 1942), Arizona State Senate
John M. Henderson (1868–1947), Texas State Senate
John S. Henderson (1846–1916), North Carolina State Senate
Monroe Henderson (1818–1899), New York State Senate
Thomas Henderson (New Jersey politician) (1743–1824), New Jersey State Senate
Warren Henderson (1927–2011), Florida State Senate